Associazione Sportiva Noicattaro Calcio was an Italian association football club located in Noicattaro, Apulia. Its colors were black and red.

In 2006–07, Noicattaro won the division H of Serie D league thus gaining its first promotion ever in Serie C2.

In its last season it played in Lega Pro Seconda Divisione. Following bankruptcy in 2010, they subsequently folded.

External links

Football clubs in Apulia
Association football clubs established in 1992
Association football clubs disestablished in 2010
Serie C clubs
1992 establishments in Italy
2010 disestablishments in Italy